Leena Majaranta (born 14 November 1958 in Tampere) is a Finnish retired ice hockey player.  Majaranta played internationally for the Finnish National team at the 1990 IIHF Women's World Championship.  Majaranta played in five games for Finland, scoring three goals and adding two assists.  Finland captured the bronze medal at the tournament.

References

Living people
1958 births
Finnish women's ice hockey forwards
Ice hockey people from Tampere
Ilves Naiset players